Purlieu is a term used of the outlying parts of a place or district. It was a term of the old Forest law, and meant, as defined by John Manwood, Treatise of the Lawes of the Forest (1598, 4th ed. 1717), 
The owner of freelands in the purlieu to the yearly value of forty shillings was known as a purlieu-man or purley-man. The benefits of disafforestation accrued only to the owner of the lands.

The word survives in placenames. Examples include Dibden Purlieu in Hampshire, on the border of the New Forest and Bedford Purlieus, once part of Rockingham Forest; also as Purley, in London, and Purley on Thames, in Berkshire. It also survives in the surname, Purley.

References

Bibliography 
Rackham, Oliver (1976) Trees and Woodland in the British Landscape. (London: J.M.Dent & Sons Ltd.) .

External links

French words and phrases
French legal terminology
English forest law